Mount 7 is a mountain in the Canadian Rockies just southeast of Golden, British Columbia. It is named for the characteristic "7" formation visible in the snow near its peak, visible for several weeks around mid-June due to the melting pattern of snow and ice at its cap.

External links
Flygolden.ca
Mt7.ca
Pages.cpsc.ucalgary.ca
Trailpeak.com
Tourismgolden.com

Columbia Valley
Populated places in the Columbia-Shuswap Regional District
Two-thousanders of British Columbia
Interior of British Columbia
Geology of British Columbia